Corney is a small settlement in Cumbria, England, and located in the west of the Lake District. It is near the A595 road, in the civil parish of Waberthwaite and it is located north east of Bootle and is 10 miles north of Millom.
The name is well known to travellers who take the fell road from Duddon Bridge to Ravenglass, as this route is known as the "Corney Fell Road". It is possible to see the Isle of Man, North Wales and parts of Scotland from Corney on a clear day.

Corney is home to a predominantly agricultural community. Corney is also close to the ruins of a 12th-century Benedictine nunnery (no public access). St John's Church dates back to as early as the 12th century.

Corney, coincidentally, is almost exactly located at the South West Corner of The British Geological Survey, 1:50,000 Geological Sheet 38 (England and Wales). Corney is underlain by Grandiorite of the Eskdale intrusion, intruded during the Ordovician period.

See also

Listed buildings in Waberthwaite

https://search.justice.gov/search?query=corney&op=Search&affiliate=justice

References

External links

 Cumbria County History Trust: Corney (nb: provisional research only – see Talk page)
Local information website
Corney at Streetmap.co.uk

Villages in Cumbria
Borough of Copeland